Thomas Mathieu Romain Mangani (born 29 April 1987) is a French professional footballer who plays as a midfielder for  club Ajaccio.

Career
In summer 2014, Mangani left France to play for Chievo, signing a two-year contract with the Serie A club on 6 July 2014. However, after a disappointing season in Italy, where he only played 45 minutes for Chievo, Mangani returned to France with Angers, with whom he signed a three-year deal on 4 July 2015.

On 13 June 2022, Mangani signed a two-year contract with newly-promoted Ligue 1 side Ajaccio, returning to the club after fourteen years.

References

External links

1987 births
Living people
People from Carpentras
French people of Italian descent
Sportspeople from Vaucluse
French footballers
Footballers from Provence-Alpes-Côte d'Azur
Association football defenders
Ligue 1 players
Ligue 2 players
Championnat National 2 players
Serie A players
AS Monaco FC players
Stade Brestois 29 players
AC Ajaccio players
AS Nancy Lorraine players
A.C. ChievoVerona players
Angers SCO players
French expatriate footballers
French expatriate sportspeople
Expatriate footballers in Italy